Mojado may refer to:
"Mojado" (song), a song by Ricardo Arjona
Wetback (slur), an English-language slur used predominantly against Mexican-Americans